Individual psychology is a psychological method or science founded by the Viennese psychiatrist Alfred Adler. The English edition of Adler's work on the subject (1925) is a collection of papers and lectures given mainly between 1912 and 1914. The papers cover the whole range of human psychology in a single survey, and were intended to mirror the indivisible unity of the personality.

In developing the concept of individual psychology, Adler broke away from the psychoanalytic school of Sigmund Freud. While Adler initially called his work "free psychoanalysis", he later rejected the label of "psychoanalyst". His method, involving a holistic approach to the study of character, has been extremely influential in later 20th century counselling and psychiatric strategies.
 
The term "individual psychology" does not mean to focus on the individual. Adler said one must take into account the patient's whole environment, including the people the patient associates with. The term "individual" is used to mean the patient is an indivisible whole.

Adler's psychology

Adler moved the grounds of psychological determinence from sex and libido, the Freudian standpoint, to one based on the individual evaluation of world. He gave special prominence to societal factors. According to him, a person has to combat or confront three forces: societal, love-related, and vocational forces. These confrontations determine the final nature of a personality. Adler based his theories on the pre-adulthood development of a person. He laid stress areas such as hated children, physical deformities at birth, birth order, etc.

Adler's theory is similar to the humanistic psychology of Abraham Maslow, who acknowledged Adler's influence on his own theories. Both maintain that the individual human being is the best determinant of his or her own needs, desires, interests, and growth.

The theory of compensation, resignation and over-compensation
According to Adler, humans are primarily motivated by an inferiority complex. In his view, an individual derives his or her personality traits from external factors that arise out of drive for superiority. The character of the individual is formed by his or her responses to their influence in the following ways:

Compensation

Compensation is a tendency to make up for underdevelopment or inferiority of physical or mental functioning through interest and training, usually within a relatively normal range of development. Neurosis and other pathological states reveal the safe-guarding or defensive strategems (largely unconscious or out of awareness) of the individual who believes her- or himself to be unequal to the demands of life, in a struggle to compensate for a felt weakness, physical or psychological.

In "normal" development, the child has experienced encouragement and accepts that her or his problems can be overcome in time by an investment of patient persistence and cooperation with others. The "normal" person feels a full member of life and has "the courage to be imperfect" (Sofie Lazarsfeld).

In less fortunate circumstances, the child, trapped within a sense of inferiority, compensates - or overcompensates, perhaps in grandiose fashion - by striving, consciously and unconsciously, to overcome and solve the problems of life, moving "from a felt minus to a felt plus". A high level of compensation produces subsequent psychological difficulties.

Resignation
There are those who give in to their disadvantages and/or fears and become reconciled to them. Such people are in the majority. The attitude of the world towards them is of a cool, rather uninterested sympathy.

Over-compensation
Over-compensation reflects a more powerful impulse to gain an extra margin of development, frequently beyond the normal range.  This may take a useful direction toward exceptional achievement, as the stutterer Demosthenes became an outstanding orator, or a useless direction toward excessive perfectionism. Genius may result from extraordinary over-compensation.  Under-compensation reflects a less active, even passive attitude toward development that usually places excessive expectations and demands on other people.

There are some persons who become so infatuated with the idea of compensating for their disadvantages that they end up over-indulging in the pursuit. These are the neurotics. Thus, external factors are vital in character formation.

Primary and secondary feelings of inferiority

The primary feeling of inferiority is the original and normal feeling that the infant or child of smallness, weakness, and dependency may experience: appreciation of this fact was a fundamental element in Adler's thinking, and an important part of his break with Sigmund Freud. An inferiority feeling usually acts as an incentive for development.  However, a child may develop an exaggerated feeling of inferiority as a result of physiological difficulties or handicaps, inappropriate parenting (including abuse, neglect, over-pampering), or cultural and/or economic barriers.

The secondary inferiority feeling is the adult's feeling of insufficiency that results from having adopted an unrealistically high or impossible compensatory goal, often one of perfection.  The degree of distress is proportional to the subjective or felt distance from that goal.  In addition to this distress, the residue of the original, primary feeling of inferiority may still haunt an adult.  An inferiority complex is an extreme expectation that one will fail in the tasks of life that can lead to pessimistic resignation and an assumed inability to overcome difficulties.

Feeling of community
Translated variably from the German, Gemeinschaftsgefuehl can mean community feeling, social interest, social feeling, or social sense.  Feeling of community is a recognition and acceptance of the interconnectedness of all people, experienced on affective, cognitive, and behavioral levels; and was increasingly emphasized in Adler's later writings.

At the affective level, it is experienced as a deep feeling of belonging to the human race and empathy with fellow men and women.  At the cognitive level, it is experienced as a recognition of interdependence with others, i.e., that the welfare of any one individual ultimately depends on the welfare of everyone.  At the behavioral level, these thoughts and feelings can then be translated into actions aimed at self-development as well as cooperative and helpful movements directed toward others. Thus, at its heart the concept of "feeling of community" encompasses individuals' full development of their capacities, a process that is both personally fulfilling and results in people who have something worthwhile to contribute to one another.

Withdrawal
In cases of discouragement the individual, feeling unable to unfold a real and socially valid development, erects a fantasy of superiority - what Adler termed "an attempt at a planned final compensation and a (secret) life plan" - in some backwater of life, which offers seclusion and shelter from the threat of failure and annihilation of personal prestige. This fictional world, sustained by the need to safeguard an anxious ego, by private logic at variance with reason or common sense, by a schema of apperception which interprets and filters and suppresses the real-world data, is a fragile bubble waiting to be burst by mounting tension within and by assaults from the real world. The will to be or become has been replaced by the will to seem.

Holism
Central to the Adlerian approach is to see the personality as a whole and not as the mere net result of component forces. Thus the term individual (indivisible) psychology. Adlerians adopt a radical stance that cuts across the nature-nurture debate by seeing the developing individual at work in creating the personality in response to the demands of nature and nurture but not absolutely determined by them. The self-created personality operates subjectively and idiosyncratically. The individual is endowed with a striving both for self-development and social meaning - what Adler himself called "the concept of social usefulness and the general well-being of humanity" - expressed in a sense of belonging, usefulness and contribution, and even cosmic consciousness.

Classical Adlerian psychology today

Classical Adlerian psychology is still practiced today. The modern movement describes itself as holistic and values-based, involving both depth psychology and an appreciation of practical, democratic principles in daily life. Its mission is to encourage the development of psychologically healthy and cooperative individuals, couples, and families in order to effectively pursue the ideals of social equality and democratic living. The model assumes that the psyche is not internally conflicted nor divided against itself, but yearns for purpose, direction, and unity with the whole. 

Henri Ellenberger wrote in the seventies of "the slow and continuous penetration of Adlerian insights into contemporary psychological thinking".

Adlerians continue to flourish in the 21st century, some employing an eclectic technique integrating elements of other therapies, from the psychodynamic to the cognitive, others focusing on a more classical approach.

With a foundation in the original teachings and therapeutic style of Alfred Adler, the movement today integrates several resources: the contributions of Kurt Adler, Alexander Müller, Lydia Sicher, Sophia de Vries, and Anthony Bruck; the self-actualization research of Abraham Maslow, himself mentored by Adler; and the creative innovations of Henry Stein.

Striving for significance
The basic, common movement of every human being is, from birth until death, of overcoming, expansion, growth, completion, and security. This may take a negative turn into a striving for superiority or power over other people. However, this is more about a person trying to find their place in this world and to feel that they belong. Unfortunately, many reference works mistakenly refer only to the negative "striving for power" as Adler's basic premise.

Style of life

A concept reflecting the organization of the personality, including the meaning individuals give to the world, to others, and to themselves, their fictional final goal, and the affective, cognitive, and behavioral strategies they employ to reach the goal: it may be normal or neurotic.  This style is also viewed in the context of the individual's approach to or avoidance of the three tasks of life: other people, work, love and sex.

Fictional final goal
Classical Adlerian Psychology assumes a central personality dynamic reflecting the growth and forward movement of life, reflecting the influence on Adler of Vaihinger's concept of fictions. It is a future-oriented striving toward an ideal goal of significance, superiority, success or completion: what Adler himself called "an attempt at a planned final compensation and a (secret) life plan".

The pervasive feeling of inferiority, for which one aims to compensate, leads to the creation of a fictional final goal which subjectively seems to promise total relief from the feeling of inferiority, future security, and success. The depth of the inferior feeling usually determines the height of the goal which then becomes the "final cause" of behavior patterns.

Unity of the personality
The position that all of the cognitive, affective, and behavioral facets of the individual are viewed as components of an integrated whole, moving in one psychological direction, without internal contradictions or conflicts. Gerald Corey (2012) stated in his book, Theory and Practice of Counseling and Psychotherapy, that personality can only be understood holistically/systemically. The individual is an indivisible whole, born, reared, and living in specific familial, social, and cultural contexts. In a recent interview with the Journal of Individual Psychology, Jane Griffith said, "The holistic character of thought is in Adler's choice of the term Individual Psychology. It's one word in German, Individualpsychologie: indivisible. Not to be chopped into bits. Adler also thought that not only is the individual not to be divided up, he's not to be seen as apart from his context either. He said that you can't examine an isolated individual."

Private logic (vs. common sense)
Private logic is the reasoning invented by an individual to stimulate and justify a style of life.  By contrast, common sense represents society's cumulative, consensual reasoning that recognizes the wisdom of mutual benefit.  Harold Mosak in 1995 described Five Basic Mistakes:
 Overgeneralizations
 False or Impossible Goals
 Misperceptions of Life and Life's Demands
 Denial of One's Basic Worth
 Faulty Values

Safeguarding tendency
Cognitive and behavioral strategies used to avoid or excuse oneself from imagined failure.  They can take the form of symptoms—such as anxiety, phobias, or depression—which can all be used as excuses for avoiding the tasks of life and transferring responsibility to others.  They can also take the form of aggression or withdrawal. Aggressive safeguarding strategies include deprecation, accusations, or self-accusations and guilt, which are used as means for elevating a fragile self-esteem and safeguarding an overblown, idealized image of oneself.  Withdrawal takes various forms of physical, mental, and emotional distancing from seemingly threatening people and problems.

Psychology of use (vs. possession)
The perspective that an individual uses his thinking, feeling, and actions (even his symptoms) to achieve a social end.  He does not merely inherit or possess certain qualities, traits, or attitudes, but adopts only those characteristics that serve his goal, and rejects those that do not fit his intentions.  This  assumption emphasizes personal responsibility for one's character.

Classical Adlerian psychotherapy
Classical Adlerian psychotherapy may involve individual psychotherapy, couple therapy, or family therapy, brief or lengthier therapy – but all such approaches follow parallel paths, which are rooted in the individual psychology of Adler.

Adler's therapy involved identifying an individual's private life plan, explaining its self-defeating, useless and predictable aspects, and encouraging a shift of interest towards social and communal goals. Among the specific techniques used were paradoxes, humorous or historical examples, analysis of the self-protective role of symptoms, and reduction of transference by encouraging self-responsibility. Adler also favored what has been called 'prescribing the symptom' – a form of anti-suggestion aimed at making the client's self-defeating behavior less attractive to them.

Based on a growth model of the mind, Adler's approach aimed at fostering social interest, and reducing repetitive life styles based on archaic private logic. With its emphasis on reasoning with the patient, classical Adlerian therapy has affinities with the later approach of cognitive behavioral therapy.

At the heart of Adlerian psychotherapy is the process of encouragement, grounded in the feeling of universal cohumanity and the belief in the as yet slumbering potential of the patient or client. By making the patient aware of their secret life plan, the therapist is able to offer an alternative outlook better adapted to the wider world of social interests.

This process of encouragement also makes the Adlerian approach so valuable to all those professions that concern themselves with the development and education of children - therapeutic education being one of Adler's central concerns.

Goals/overview
Adlerian psychotherapy is unique in the sense that each client has their own individual type of therapy. The therapy, however, is created by the therapist on a six-phase process.  The overall goal of the therapy is to establish a relationship between client and community in order not only to challenge the client's unhealthy and unrealistic thoughts of the world, but also to challenge them to replace self-defeating behaviors for ones that will lead to a more positive and healthy lifestyle. The stages of this classical psychotherapy are:

Phase 1: This phase focuses on support and is broken down into two stages. The first stage emphasizes empathy and relationships. The therapist provides warmth, acceptance, and generate hope while giving reassurance and encouragement to the client. The second stage in this phase is focused on gathering information on the client. Early childhood memories and influences are sought out as well as details that provide information on how the client faces life problems.
Phase 2: The primary focus in phase two is on encouragement. This is done through two stages of clarification and encouragement. Therapists clarify any vague thinking with Socratic questioning and evaluate the consequences of various actions or ideas. They help the client correct inappropriate ideas about his or her self and others. They also help the client create alternative ways of thinking to move his/her life into a new direction while clarifying feelings.
Phase 3: Insight is the headline for phase 3. Interpretation and recognition, as well as knowing are the focus of the Insight phase. The client will learn to interpret his/her feelings and goals as well as identify what s/he has avoided in the past. This stage integrates many Freudian ideas such as dreams, daydreams, and recollections.  The Knowing stage is where the client is now fully aware of his/her lifestyle and does not require any additional help with this. They know and accept what they need to change.
Phase 4: The fourth phase is all about change. Change is first addressed through the stage of an Emotional Breakthrough. This can be achieved through the use of role playing, guided imagery and narration. The next stage is Doing Differently. The client will break old patterns and change their attitude. This is achieved through creating steps which are based on abstract ideas. The last stage in this phase is Reinforcement. The therapist will encourage all efforts made by the client to promote change. They will reward and affirm positive feelings and changes while simultaneously evaluating the progress made by the client.
Phase 5: The final phase is about Challenge. The client goes through a first stage which is characterized by social interest. S/he is instructed to give 100% in all relationships and is encouraged to take risks. S/he is required to extend new feelings of cooperation and empathy to others. Then, through goal redirection, the client is challenged to release his/her old self and open a new self and live by these new values. The last and final stage is focused on support and launching. The therapist will inspire the client to enjoy the unfamiliar, strengthen their feelings of connectedness to others, and to continue self growth.
Phase 6: The Meta-Therapy phase is for clients who have gone through Adler's therapy, readjusted their lives to better suit their goals, and who are making progress in becoming who they want to be. This ending part of the therapy advises clients to find out what aspects of life are truly important to them, and to pursue these "higher values".

The Socratic method is aimed to guide clients to clarify feelings and meanings, gain insight to intentions and consequences and to consider alternative options. Guided imagery helps bring awareness, change and growth. Role playing encourages new behaviors and gives the client practice in how to manage conflict and other challenges.

Uses

Individual
The basic structure of individual therapy in classical Adlerian psychotherapy is broken down into 5 phases plus a post-therapy follow up, and each phase is broken down into multiple stages, 13 total. Each of these stages has different goals for the client and therapist to accomplish. This is the type of therapy classical Adlerian psychotherapy was designed for.

Teacher-education programs
Teacher-education programs have been designed to increase child cooperation in classrooms. Teachers, parents, and school administrators attend these programs and learn techniques to increase their own teaching effectiveness in the classroom as well as how to learn to better handle children. These programs are taught in the same manner that marital programs are taught.

Couple-enrichment programs
Similar to group couple counseling, couple-enrichment programs are conducted by trained professionals and have groups of couples (typically about 10) attend and learn how to improve and enrich their relationships. Many different teaching formats are used that include tools such as role playing, the viewing of videos, and the implementation of other psycho-social exercises. Sessions run for about an hour's time.

Parent and family education programs
These programs are comparable to classes taught by family life educators. The programs focus on building better family relationships.

Contemporary techniques
There are two main contemporary schools of Adlerian psychotherapy, those following Rudolf Dreikurs, and those calling themselves by contrast classical Adlerians. There are many organizations that write about and still practice this psychology (The North American Society of Aldlerian Psychology (NASAP), The Journal of Individual Psychology, the International Associate of Individual Psychology (IAIP), the International Congress of Adlerian Summer Schools and Institutes (ICASSI), and various other organizations). Many universities around the world offer postgraduate training in Adlerian psychology. This psychotherapy is growing and is steadily and increasingly being assimilated into mainstream psychotherapy.

There is a debate among contemporary Adlerians over the relative roles of belongingness and superiority in determining character, the school associated with Rudolf Dreikurs emphasizing the former, as opposed to the classical Adlerian theorists.

Dreikurs
Rudolf Dreikurs is a psychiatrist who studied under Adler in Vienna. While Adler's work was very popular and received well by American audiences, it lost popularity after his death. Dreikurs revived Adler psychotherapy after Adler's death.

Building on Adler's writings, Dreikurs conceptualized a four-stage approach to Adlerian psychotherapy:
 Establishing the therapeutic relationship.
 Assessing the client's life style.
 Promoting the client's insight into their fictive goal.
 Encouraging clients to broaden their interests from the defensive function of a private logic into a broader sense of community.

Classical Adlerian psychologists
Adlerian pertains to the theory and practice of Alfred Adler (1870 - 1937), the founder of individual psychology (Individualpsychologie). Adlerian clients are encouraged to overcome their feelings of insecurity, develop deeper feelings of connectedness, and to redirect their striving for significance into more socially beneficial directions. Through a respectful Socratic dialogue, they are challenged to correct mistaken assumptions, attitudes, behaviors and feelings about themselves and the world.

Constant encouragement stimulates clients to attempt what was previously felt as impossible. The growth of confidence, pride, and gratification leads to a greater desire and ability to cooperate.

The ultimate objective of classical Adlerian psychotherapy is to replace exaggerated self-protection (safeguarding), self-enhancement and self-indulgence, with greater self-knowledge and genuine, courageous social feelings. Notable Adlerians include:

History

Alfred Adler was greatly influenced by early socialism and Freud. This can be seen in his early work and theories. He emphasized that individuals themselves can change their lives. Adler and Freud respected one another; however, Adler did not fully agree or accept Freud's theories. Adler believed childhood experiences have influences on people's current problems, but he also did not believe they are the only contributions. He also emphasizes free will and an inborn drive as contributors to current problems people face. He doesn't believe individuals are victims of their past experiences.

Biography
"Alfred Adler was born to a Jewish family on February 7th, 1870 in the outskirts of Vienna. He was the second oldest child of six. He was often sick as a child, and once he became knowledgeable of death, he decided to become a physician some day.
Adler's childhood sickness made him appear weak and inferior. A teacher recommended that he quit school to become an apprentice shoemaker. Adler's family objected to this and Alfred eventually went to medical school and graduated from the University of Vienna with his medical degree specializing in ophthalmology.
Alfred met his future wife, Raissa Timofeyewna Epstein, in a series of political meetings which revolved around the current rising socialist movement. The two were married in 1897
Adler started a private practice which slowly switched to internal medicine. It was here that he observed that many of his patients had diseases that could be traced to social situation origins.
Adler's first publication discussed how the social conditions of where people worked influenced diseases and disease processes."

Career
Early in his career, Adler was focused on public health, medical and psychological prevention, and social welfare. Later on he shifted towards children at risk, women's rights, adult education, teacher training, community mental health, family counseling and education, and briefly psychotherapy. Adler started The Group for Free Psychoanalytic Research, which was later changed to Individual Psychology, with individual meaning "indivisible".  With this he also founded his own journal, the Journal for Individual Psychology. This is when classical Adlerian psychotherapy began. Adler focused on psychoanalysis when he started his own group, even working in his private practice as a psychiatrist, but that did not last long. After World War I, Adler shifted toward community and social orientation. He also became more of a philosopher, social psychologist, and educator.

Components
Adler had many areas of focus, but there are some key components that contributed to classical Adlerian psychotherapy (a.k.a. individual psychology). Children are born with an inborn force, which enables people to make their own decision, and develop their own opinions. He stated that individuals aren't just a product of their situations; they are creators of their situations. A person's feelings, beliefs and behaviors all work together to make each individual unique.
Another area of focus on was the concept of fictions. It is believed that fictions are conscious and non-conscious ideas that are not necessarily aligned with reality, but serve as a guide to cope with reality. People create fictions as ways of seeing themselves, others around them and their environments and that people do this to guide their feelings, thoughts, and actions.

Another concept is finality. This is the belief that there is only one organized force, a fictionate final goal. Fictionate final goal has been established in early childhood and is present for the rest of a person's life. It is mostly unconscious and influences behavior. With fictionate final goal, questions are asked more along the lines of "what for" or "where to" instead of "why" or "where from". The goal and purpose of a behavior is looked at instead of finding the cause of a behavior. The final cause of the behavior is the focus, which is where fictionate final goal is termed.

Social interest is another area that contributes to classical Adlerian psychotherapy. He believes individuals are social beings. The way an individual acts with other people is greatly important in terms of their psychological health. Social interest means feeling a part of a family, group or community. An important concept related to social interest is the ability to feel empathy. Showing empathy is a way to connect with others.

Works 
 Adler, A., Über Den Nervösen Charakter: Grundzüge Einer Vergleichenden Individual-Psychologie Und Psychotherapie, (3rd, revised edition, J F Bergmann Verlag, Munich 1922).
 Adler, A., Praxis und Theorie der Individual-Psychologie: Vorträge zur Einführung in die Psychotherapie für Ärzte, Psychologen und Lehrer (Bergmann, 1st edn. Wiesbaden 1919, Munich 1920, 2nd ed. 1924, 3rd ed. 1927, 4th ed. 1930).
 Adler, A., The Practice and Theory of Individual Psychology, translated by P. Radin (Routledge & Kegan Paul, London 1925; revised edition 1929, & reprints).
 Adler, A., Die Technik der Individual-Psychologie. 1: Die Kunst, eine Lebens- und Krankengeschichte zu lesen (1st edn., Bergmann, Munich 1928).
 Adler, A., Die Technik der Individual-Psychologie. 2: Die Seele des schwer erziehbaren Schulkindes (Bergmann, Munich 1928: Fischer Verlag 1974).
 Adler, A., Problems of Neurosis: A Book of Case-Histories, edited by Philip Mairet, with prefatory essay by F. G. Crookshank, "Individual Psychology: A Retrospect (and a Valuation)", pp. vii–xxxvii (Kegan Paul, Trench, Trubner & co., London 1929).
 Adler, A., The Individual Psychology of Alfred Adler, H. L. Ansbacher and R. R. Ansbacher (Eds.) (Harper Torchbooks, New York 1956).

 Papers contained in Individual Psychology (1929 English revised edition) 
 "Individual-Psychology, its assumptions and its results" (1914)
 "Psychical hermaphrodism and the Masculine protest: the cardinal problem of nervous diseases" (1912)
 "New leading principles for the practice of Individual-Psychology" (1913)
 "Individual-Psychological treatment of neuroses" (1913)
 "Contributions to the theory of hallucination" (1912)
 "The study of child psychology and neurosis" (International Congress lecture, 1913)
 "The Psychic treatment of trigeminal neuralgia" (1911)
 "The problem of distance"
 "The masculine attitude in female neurotics"
 "The concept of resistance during treatment" (1916)
 "Syphilophobia" (1911) (phobias and hypochondriac states in the dynamics of neurosis)
 "Nervous insomnia" (1914)
 "Individual-Psychological conclusions on sleep disturbances" (1912)
 "Homo-sexuality" (Lecture to Jurististisch-Medizinische Society, Zurich, 1918)
 "Compulsion neurosis" (Lecture in Zurich, 1918)
 "The function of the compulsion-conception as a means of intensifying the individuality-feeling" (1913)
 "Neurotic hunger-strike"
 "Dreams and dream-interpretation" (Lecture, 1912)
 "The role of the unconscious in neurosis" (1913)
 "Life-lie and responsibility in neurosis and psychosis - A contribution to Melancholia" (1914)
 "Melancholia and paranoia - Individual-psychological results from a study of psychoses" (1914)
 "Individual-psychological remarks on Alfred Berger's Hofrat Eysenhardt" (Lecture, 1912)
 "Dostoevsky" (Lecture, Zurich Tonhalle, 1918)
 "New view-points on War neuroses (1908)"
 "Myelodysplasia (Organ inferiority)" (summary from Studie uber Minderwertigkeit von Organen)
 "Individual-psychological education" (Lecture, Zurich Association of Physicians, 1918)
 "The Individual-psychology of prostitution"
 "Demoralized children" (Lecture, 1920)

Criticism
Karl Popper argued that Adler's individual psychology like psychoanalysis is a pseudoscience because its claims are not testable and cannot be refuted; that is, they are not falsifiable.

See also
 Classical Adlerian psychology
 Classical Adlerian psychotherapy
 North American Society of Adlerian Psychology
 Adlerian
 Neo-Adlerian
 Alfred Adler
 The Practice and Theory of Individual Psychology Gemeinschaft und Gesellschaft
 Psychology
 Journal of Individual Psychology
 Rudolf Dreikurs
 Style of life

 Notes 

 References 

 Dinkmeyer, D.C., Pew, W.L., & Dinkmeyer, D.C. Jr. (1979). Adlerian counseling and psychotherapy. Monterey, CA: Brooks/Cole.
 Fall, K.A., Holden, J.M., & Marquis, A. (2002). Theoretical models of counseling and psychotherapy. New York: Brunner-Routledge.
 Hoffman, E. (1994). The drive for self: Alfred Adler and the founding of Individual Psychology. Reading, MA: Addison-Wesley Publishing.
 Mosak, H.H., & Di Pietro, R. (2006). Early recollections: Interpretive method and application. New York: Routledge.
 Oberst, U.E., & Stewart, A.E. (2003). Adlerian psychotherapy: An advanced approach to Individual Psychology. New York: Brunner-Routledge.

Bibliography
 Marty Sapp, 'Adlerian Psychotherapy', in Cognitive-Behavioral Theories of Counselling (2004) Chapter 3.

Further reading
 Adler, Alfred: Individual Psychology (1929).
 A. Adler, 'Individual Psychology', in G. B. Levitas ed., The World of Psychology (1963)
 Ansbacher, R. R. & Ansbacher, H. L.: The Individual Psychology of Alfred Adler (1956).
 Ellenberger, Henri: The Discovery of the Unconscious (1970).
 Kishimi, Ichiro & Koga, Fumitake: The courage to be disliked'' (2013).

External links

International Association of Individual Psychology
Classical Adlerian Psychology according to Alfred Adlers Institutes in San Francisco and Northwestern Washington
Centro de Estudios Adlerianos - Uruguay
Journal of Individual Psychology
 alfredadler.org
What is an Adlerian? 
 Regional pages:
Adlerians in France
Adlerians in Germany 
Adlerians in Ireland
Adlerians in Japan
Adlerians in Romania
Adlerians in the UK
Adlerians in Uruguay
North American Society of Adlerian Psychology
  Development of Adlerian Psychology in the 20th Century
G. J. Manaster/R. J. Corsini, 'Individual Psychology, theory and practice'
Centro de Estudios Adlerianos - Uruguay

Psychological schools
Adlerian psychology